Prescott B. Huntington (July 26, 1905 – March 24, 1988) was an American politician who served in the New York State Assembly from 1957 to 1970.

He died on March 24, 1988, in St. James, New York at age 82.

His great-grandfather was New York assemblyman, Suffolk County district attorney, and Suffolk County judge J. Lawrence Smith.

References

1905 births
1988 deaths
Republican Party members of the New York State Assembly
20th-century American politicians